Mpiemo (Bimu) is a Bantu language of the Central African Republic. The  (ALCAM, or "Linguistic Atlas of Cameroon") gives the name .

There is little description of the language, but one team used Mpiemo data to test the ability of compute programs to analyze real language data.

References

Languages of the Central African Republic
Makaa-Njem languages